When Day Breaks is a 2012 Serbian drama film directed by Goran Paskaljević. The film was selected as the Serbian entry for the Best Foreign Language Oscar at the 85th Academy Awards, but it did not make the final shortlist.

Cast
 Mustafa Nadarević as Professor Miša Brankov
 Mira Banjac as Ana Brankov
 Zafir Hadžimanov as Marko Popović
 Predrag Ejdus as Rabbi
 Meto Jovanovski as Mitar
 Toma Jovanović as Najfeld
 Rade Kojadinović as Kosta Brankov
 Olga Odanović as a Refugee
 Nada Šargin as Marija
 Damir Todorović as German Officer

See also
 List of submissions to the 85th Academy Awards for Best Foreign Language Film
 List of Serbian submissions for the Academy Award for Best Foreign Language Film

References

External links
 

2012 films
2012 drama films
2010s Serbian-language films
Films directed by Goran Paskaljević
Films set in Belgrade
Films shot in Belgrade
Serbian drama films